Manzur Hasan Mintu (died 18 November 2014) was a Bangladeshi footballer who played as a goalkeeper. He worked for radio and television as a sports commentator for 40 years since the 1970s. He was awarded National Sports Award for football and badminton by the Government of Bangladesh in 1978.

Career
Mintu graduated from the University of Dhaka and worked as an income tax commissioner. After the retirement, he served as the treasurer of the national sports council.

Mintu played for Pakistan national football team in the 1958 Asian Games in Tokyo.

Honours
Dhaka Wanderers Club
Dhaka League = 1960

References

1940 births
2014 deaths
University of Dhaka alumni
Bangladeshi footballers
Pakistan international footballers
Association football goalkeepers
Asian Games competitors for Pakistan
Footballers at the 1958 Asian Games
Recipients of the Bangladesh National Sports Award
Pakistani footballers